This is a list of Somalists. These scholars specialize in Somali Studies, the scholarly term for research concerning Somali people and Greater Somalia.

Notable Somalist scholars
Abdalla Omer Mansur – linguistics and anthropology
Abdi Ismail Samatar – geography
Abdi Mohamed Kusow – sociology
 Abdisalam Abdulle Garjeh  - Pop Culture and Urban History
 Abdiweli Mohamed Ali  - Economics 
Prof. Abdisalam Issa-Salwe – information systems
Abdullahi Hagi Bashir Ismail – history and politics
 Abdul Ahmed III  - Political Economy and Global Strategy
Abdurahman Moalim Abdullahi Badiyow – history and religion
Ahmed Ismail Samatar – International Relations
Ali A. Abdi - anthropology and sociology
Ali Jimale Ahmed – history and linguistics
Annarita Puglielli – linguistics
Bogumił Witalis Andrzejewski – linguistics
Cawo Mohamed Abdi – Sociology, Politics and Religion
Charles Geshekter – history
David D. Laitin – politics and history
Enrico Cerulli – history and linguistics
Harold C. Fleming – anthropology and linguistics
I.M. Lewis – anthropology and history
Lee Cassanelli – history
Lidwien Kapteijns – history
Martin Orwin – linguistics
Helmi Ben Meriem -literature 
Mohamed Abdi Gandi – anthropology
Mohamed Haji Mukhtar – history
Mohamed Haji Rabi – linguistics
Mohamed Diriye Abdullahi – linguistics
Musa Haji Ismail Galal – history and linguistics
Mustafa Feiruz – linguistics
Neville Chittick – history and archaeology
Osman Yusuf Kenadid – history, science and philosophy
Said Sheikh Samatar – linguistics and sociology
Shire Jama Ahmed – linguistics and sociology
Virginia Luling – history
Sada Mire – archaeology and history 
Hussein M. Adam – politics and history

See also
Somali Studies

 
Somalists